Following is a List of senators of Ardennes, people who have represented the department of Ardennes in the Senate of France.

Third Republic 

Senators for Ardennes under the French Third Republic were:

 Charles Cunin-Gridaine (1876 –1880)
 Edmond Toupet des Vignes (1876–1882)
 Gustave Gailly (1880 –1903)
 Louis Eugène Péronne (1882–1892)
 Louis Tirman (1892 –1899)
 Théophile Armand Neveux (1888–1893)
 Étienne Drumel (1893 –1897)
 Désiré Linard (1898–1898)
 Charles Goutant (1898–1906)
 Eugène Fagot (1900 –1919)
 Albert Gérard (1903–1930)
 Gustave Gobron (1907–1911)
 Lucien Hubert (1912–1938)
 Léon Charpentier (1920–1930)
 Albert Meunier (1930–1939)
 Henri Philippoteaux (1930 –1935)
 Firmin Leguet (1936–1945)
 Ernest Labbé (1939–1942)
 Edmond Hannotin (1939–1945)

Fourth Republic 

Senators for Ardennes under the French Fourth Republic were:

 Marie-Hélène Cardot (8 December 1946 – 26 April 1959) (Groupe du Mouvement Républicain Populaire)
 Eugène Cuif (19 June 1955 – 26 April 1959), (Groupe des Républicains Indépendants)
 Jacques Bozzi (7 November 1948 – 19 June 1955), (Groupe Socialiste)
 André Victoor (8 December 1946 – 7 November 1948), (Groupe Communiste)

Fifth Republic 

Senators for Ardennes under the French Fifth Republic:

References

Sources

 
Ardennes